The Gibraltar national under-16 football team is the youngest active youth football team of Gibraltar, run by the Gibraltar Football Association. Prior to their accession to UEFA, an under-15 team participated in the Rock Cup, but this was scrapped in 2013. The team primarily participates in annual UEFA Development Tournaments, notably scoring an infamous goal through Andrew Hernandez against Macedonia in 2015.

Recent results and fixtures

Squad

Current squad
The following players were called up for the 2022 UEFA Development Tournament in Bulgaria:

 Match date: 21, 23 and 26 March 2023
 Opposition: ,  and 
 Caps and goals correct as of: 18 April 2022, after the match against .

Notes

External links
 Gibraltar Football Association

European national under-16 association football teams
under-16